Penicillium ianthinellum is a species of the genus of Penicillium.

References

ianthinellum
Fungi described in 1923